Simon Godfrey (born 18 October 1980) is a former Australian rules footballer who played for the Melbourne Demons in the Australian Football League (AFL).

Godfrey was recruited from Box Hill and debuted for the Demons in 2000, selected at number 14 in the draft. A midfielder, he was fifth in the best and fairest for 2003.

Having gained a cult-like status in 2007 with some surprisingly solid tagging roles on bigger names in the competition, Godfrey managed to notch up 100 games.

At the end of the 2007 AFL season, he was not offered a new contract, ending his AFL career after playing 105 games and scoring 23 goals for the club.

In 2008 he joined Eastern Football League Club Norwood, located in Ringwood North. He was a vital part of the midfield for Norwood and was the captain of the side in season 2010.

He then returned to play for Mitcham Football Club, where he had played as a junior years earlier.

External links

Demon Wiki profile

1980 births
Living people
Melbourne Football Club players
Australian rules footballers from Victoria (Australia)
Box Hill Football Club players